Slipher may refer to:

People
Earl C. Slipher (1883–1964), American astronomer
Vesto Slipher (1875–1969), American astronomer

Astronomical namings 
 1766 Slipher, main-belt asteroid
 Slipher (lunar crater), crater on the Moon
 Slipher (Martian crater), crater on Mars